The rufescent prinia (Prinia rufescens) is a species of bird in the family Cisticolidae.
It is found in Southeast Asia, the Indian subcontinent (mainly in the northeast) and southern Yunnan.
Its natural habitat is subtropical or tropical dry forest.

Subspecies
There are currently six recognised subspecies.
P. r. rufescens, the nominate subspecies, which occurs in east and northeast India, Bhutan, Bangladesh, south China and Myanmar. 
P. r. beavani, which occurs in southeast Myanmar, Thailand, Laos and north Vietnam.
P. r. peninsularis, which occurs in south Myanmar and south Thailand.
P. r. objurgans, which occurs in southeast Thailand and Cambodia.
P. r. extrema, which occurs in south Thailand and Peninsular Malaysia.
P. r. dalatensis, which occurs in south Vietnam.

References

rufescent prinia
Birds of Northeast India
Birds of Southeast Asia
rufescent prinia
rufescent prinia
Taxonomy articles created by Polbot